Rebecca J. Troisi is an American cancer epidemiologist specialized in the hormonal etiologies of reproductive cancers. She is a staff scientist in the trans-divisional research program at the National Cancer Institute.

Life 
Troisi completed a Sc.D. from the Harvard T.H. Chan School of Public Health in 1994. Her dissertation was titled, Epidemiology of adult-onset asthma. She joined the National Cancer Institute (NCI) the same year. Her research has focused on the hormonal etiologies of reproductive cancers and the role of maternal, gestational, neonatal and early life factors in breast cancer risk, including endocrine disruptors such as diethylstilbestrol, a drug previously given to pregnant women. Troisi and colleagues Marlene Goldman and Kathryn Rexrode edited the second edition of Women and Health, a comprehensive review of the behavioral, social, and biological determinants of health and well-being in women, published in late 2012 by Elsevier. Troisi is a staff scientist in the trans-divisional research program in the NCI division of cancer epidemiology and genetics.

Selected works

References 

Living people
Harvard School of Public Health alumni
American women epidemiologists
American epidemiologists
Cancer epidemiologists
21st-century American women scientists
National Institutes of Health people
Year of birth missing (living people)